Greetings & Salutations may refer to:

 Greetings & Salutations (Intergalactic Lovers album)
 Greetings & Salutations from Less Than Jake

See also 
 Greetings and Salutations, a 1975 big band jazz album